Meralco Avenue is a north-south thoroughfare located in Ortigas Center in Pasig, Metro Manila, Philippines. It links Ortigas Avenue in the north and Shaw Boulevard in the south and borders the western edge of Valle Verde in Ugong. It is named for the Manila Electric Company, also known as Meralco, which is headquartered on the avenue's junction with Ortigas Avenue. Other notable businesses on Meralco Avenue include UnionBank Plaza, Marco Polo Ortigas Manila, Ayala Malls The 30th, Metrowalk, and the mixed-use development called Capitol Commons at the former Rizal Provincial Capitol lot on Meralco and Shaw Boulevard.

Due to the construction of Metro Manila Subway, the portion of the avenue from Shaw Boulevard to Anda Road, adjacent to Capitol Commons, is closed since October 3, 2022, until 2028.

Route description
Spanning , the avenue begins at Shaw Boulevard in barangays Oranbo and Kapitolyo in Pasig. It runs between the Capitol Commons development on the east side and a residential village and townhouses of San Antonio to the west. It curves slightly north and intersects with Capt. Henry Javier Street towards the Department of Education complex and PhilSports Complex. A few hundred meters north, the avenue crosses Julia Vargas Avenue via a flyover then passes through the busy Ortigas Center business district on the west side and Ayala Malls The 30th, Metrowalk, and several other retail establishments on the east. The avenue ends at Ortigas Avenue with the Meralco Building as a terminating vista.

Prior to August 2012, the approximately  segment of the road from Capt. Henry Javier Street to Shaw Boulevard was previously a  two-lane road. In anticipation of increased traffic due to the development of Capitol Commons, the segment of the road was widened to a  carriageway with three northbound lanes and two southbound lanes, with a lane width of  each as a result of a joint effort between Ortigas and Company and the Pasig government.

Intersections

Landmarks

 Ayala Malls The 30th
 Capitol Commons
 Department of Education complex
 Estancia Mall
 Marco Polo Ortigas Manila
 Megatent Events Venue
 Meralco Center
 Meralco Theater
 Metrowalk
 One Corporate Centre
 PhilSports Complex 
St. Paul College Pasig
 The Exchange Regency Residence Hotel
 UnionBank Plaza

References

Streets in Metro Manila